Robot Shalu is a homemade, artificially intelligent, multilingual, social and educational humanoid robot, made-up of waste materials, that can speak 47 languages (9 Indian and 38 foreign), developed by Dinesh Kunwar Patel, a Kendriya Vidyalaya, Computer Science teacher from Mumbai, India (native of Jaunpur, Uttar Pradesh). Shalu is recognized in the top ten humanoid robots of the world by Danik Bhaskar, Vaartha, TopTen magazine, and Hindustan News. Shalu is also among top 5 trending Indian robots in the global Tech Market.

During the Corona pandemic, "Wear your mask, keep physical distance and follow government guidelines", the message being spread by Robot Shalu.

History 

The robot’s creator, Dinesh Patel states S. Shankar directed Robot (Enthiran) and Hanson Robotics developed a social humanoid robot, Sophia, as his prime motivation for building the robot. He worked on the robot for 3 years The first version of the robot was introduced to the world on 23 Nov 2020 by means of a telecast on DD News.

The robot is made at home using waste materials as well as aluminum, plastic, cardboard, wood, newspapers, and other things readily available in the local market. No 3D-printed components are used and the cost is low, around ₹ 50,000 Indian rupees ($, €). Shalu's intelligent software is designed and developed using open-source libraries like TensorFlow, NLTK, etc. by Patel. Work on the development of the next version of the robot Shalu is currently in progress.

Full form of SHALU. Robot name "Shalu” is an abbreviation. ‘S’ for Scientifically and technically, ‘H’ for Highly reciprocal, ‘A’ for Advanced Humanoid, ‘L’ for Language communicator, ‘U’ for Uniquely designed means, Scientifically designed, Uniquely and highly Advanced Language communicator Humanoid.

World Record 
"Pratishtha World Records" - Shalu has been placed in Pratishtha World Records book with the title as "World's First Artificially Intelligent Social and Educational Humanoid Robot made up of waste material", by an Indian World Record agency recognized by the Ministry of Corporate Affairs, Govt. of India

"International Book of Records"- Robot Shalu is included in the International Book of Records with the title "Most languages speaking Humanoid Robot made up of waste materials". Shalu is also included in "India Book of Records" and "Asia Book of Records" under the title "Humanoid Robot with Maximum Languages".

Features 

It is reported that Shalu can speak in 9 Indian (Hindi, Bhojpuri, Bengali, Guajarati, Malayalam, Marathi, Tamil, Telugu, Urdu, Nepali) and 38 foreign languages (including English, Japanese, German, French, Italian, Chinese, Spanish).

She can recognize people and remember them as well as identify many common objects. She can not only understand human emotions like anger, happiness, laughter, jealousy etc. but can also behave accordingly. Shalu can greet people, shake hands, recite poems. She can answer factual questions and engage in casual conversations based on the script, by using Artificial Intelligence to understand the meaning of the conversation, solve simple math problems related to Time-Speed-Distance, Simple/Compound Interest, LCM/GCF, Factors, Prime numbers, Armstrong numbers, etc, conduct verbal quizzes and interviews. Shalu can forecast weather for the current and next 10 days of any place/location, readout horoscopes based on date of birth, current news, recipes, book reviews, movies reviews and product description. She knows a range of subjects like Physics, Chemistry, General Knowledge, History and Geography, etc. and is capable to give lectures / presentations in the classroom as well as seminars.

Shalu can be used as a robot teacher in schools to give a lecture in the classroom based on an uploaded Power-Point Presentation, developed by a human teacher, answer the queries of students, ask them questions and determine the correctness of given answers too. She can work as receptionist to respond to customer queries verbally as well as e-mail and SMS. It can be used as a talking companion to senior citizens and a learning companion for young children too.

Alignment with government initiatives 
Robot Shalu is dedicated to Indian daughters towards Beti Bachao Beti Padhao mission, and this creation is a tiny step toward Atmanirbhar Bharat. and Digital India Mission.

Recognition
Ministry of Education, Govt. of India as well as the then Education Minister of India Dr. Ramesh Pokhriyal 'Nishank' tweeted about Robot Shalu on 20 March 2021 and verified the above said facts about Robot's linguistic capability and materials used.

 Robot Shalu and her creator Mr. Dinesh were invited as guest Technical Keynote speakers in the global technical summit "The World CIO Summit 2022", held in Bangkok, Thailand between 22 to 24 November 2022, where they addressed more than 40 countries' IT delegates.
 Dinesh Patel is recognized as a "Star Maker" in Asia's Largest techno festival for makers; "Maker Mela 2022". 139 makers from over 15 countries; participated in the Seventh Edition of Maker Mela.

 Shalu was invited in India International Science Festival (IISF) 2021 held in Panaji, Goa on 13 December 2021, organized by Ministry of Science and Technology, Govt. of India.

 Shalu was invited as a guest at the International Automation Expo 2022, where she delivered a speech, and became the first robot from India to address the international stage.

Shalu in Syllabus 
Robot Shalu has been included in the syllabus of the Artificial Intelligence subject of class 9 by CBSE (Central Board of Secondary Education), and in the Computer syllabus of class 6 by Kendriya Vidyalaya Sangathan.

Shalu as a Teacher 
Shalu is the world's first Robot Teacher to teach more than 6 subjects in 47 different languages, and presently she is teaching from classes 6 to 11 in a Kendriya Vidyalaya of Mumbai, India. Robot Shalu's teaching in the classroom has been inspected by the Principal of the school and expressed that the use of technology in education will give a boost to Teaching Learning Process (TLP) to produce better learning outcomes.

Award 
Robot Shalu and her creator Dinesh Patel on 25 March 2021 were awarded by Jagranjosh.com for the Best Innovation in Science and Technology with "Jagran Josh Education Award 2021" by the Education Minister of India Dr. Ramesh Pokhriyal 'Nishank'.

Dinesh said “I am keen to make it more beneficial for the students in impoverished communities. There are tens of thousands of children yet to make it to schools across India. I am targeting that to help such children who are willing to study but can't afford it. Shalu can be an example and a source of inspiration for young, energetic future scientists who fall behind due to a lack of support and encouragement." He also mentioned that "Robotics Research can be done at home as a hobby in absence of sophisticated Robotics Laboratories with Passion, Hard work, and Regularity."

Appreciations

By the Government of India 
Ministry of Corporate Affairs of India, Ministry of Education of India, Vigyan Prasar, Ministry of Science and Technology of India, and Council of Scientific and Industrial Research (CSIR) (Govt. of India), congratulated and appreciated to Dinesh Patel.

By Higher Education Institutions (HELs) 
Professor Supratik Chakraborty, Computer Science and Engineering department of IIT Bombay, appreciated the robot through a letter to Patel. In the letter, he said that it is really a great development. Such a robot can be used in the field of education, entertainment and several other fields too. Shalu can be an inspiration for the next generation scientists, as well as the Professors of IIT Dhanbad, NIT Durgapur, K. J. Somaiya College of Engineering, PIEMR Indore, and other Institutions; appreciated the work of Mr. Patel.

Public appearances

Guest in Colleges and Institutions 
"Technosaga 2k22", TechFest of Sagar Institute of Research & Technology, Bhopal (SAGE University) on 11 November 2022
"Aarohan 2022", Techno-Management Fest, NIT Durgapur (3 March 2022)
CitiusTech "Abhiyantriki 2021" Tech Expo, KJ Somaiya College of Engineering and Commerce, Mumbai(19 November 2021)
"Takshak" RoboISM, IIT Dhanbad (6 October 2021)
NSS IIT Bombay titled as "The real life Dr. Vaseegaran" (1 October 2021)

Live Interviews on Media/News Channels 
On Kamayani Mumbai, by Awanindra Ashutosh (11 July 2021)
On TV9 Bharatvarsh and TV9 Gujarati (17 June 2021)
On Radio Olive 106.3 FM (Qatar FM Radio) by RJ Vivek (2 April 2021) 
 On "Meet the Guru", India Science TV program, Engage with Science, Department of Science and Technology, Govt. of India (22 March 2021)

Other information 
The total weight of the robot is only 4 kg due to only having an upper body.

See also
  Sophia Robot, a similar robot.

References 

Humanoid robots
2020 in India
Social robots
Educational robots
Robots of India